Filipe Gomes can refer to:

 Filipe (footballer, born 1987)
 Filipe Gomes (swimmer)

See also
 Felipe Gomes (disambiguation)
 Felip Gomes (born 1978), Indian football defender